American Urban Radio Networks (AURN) is the only African-American owned and operated Nielsen RADAR-rated radio network in the United States. 

Privately held for the last three years with new ownership, AURN reaches an estimated 25 million listeners weekly and provides the advertising community with multiple networks and marketing & digital capabilities.
 

AURN Inspirational is a 24/7 Gospel music network featuring Inspirations with Liz Black, The Hezekiah Walker Show, The Hezekiah Walker Gospel Countdown, and The Bobby Jones Show. AURN handles affiliations, sales, and marketing for national morning programs Streetz Morning Takeover with Yung Joc and Ebro in The Morning with Laura Stylez and Peter Rosenberg, as well as Nessa on Air, Quiet Storm with Lenny Green, The Marvin Sapp Radio Show, The Bassment with E-Rock, The Come Up with Tye Tribbett, Most Requested Live with Romeo, and Pod Digital multicultural podcast network.  

AURN is the only African-American broadcasting company with a desk in the White House and has offices in New York City, Pittsburgh, Boston, Chicago, and Los Angeles.

References

External links 
American Urban Radio Networks

American radio networks
African-American culture
African-American mass media
Organizations established in 1991
1991 establishments in Pennsylvania